Cinnamomum tamala, Indian bay leaf, also known as tejpat, tejapatta, Malabar leaf, Indian bark, Indian cassia, or malabathrum, is a tree in the family Lauraceae that is native to India, Bangladesh, Nepal, Bhutan, and China. Its leaves have a clove-like aroma with a hint of peppery taste; they are used for culinary and medicinal purposes. It is thought to have been one of the major sources of the medicinal plant leaves known in classic and medieval times as malabathrum (or malobathrum).

Characteristics

The leaves, known as tējapattā or tejpatta (तेजपत्ता) in Hindi, tejpat (तेजपात/তেজপাত) in Nepali, Maithili and Assamese, tejpata (তেজপাতা) in Bengali, vazhanayila/edanayila (വഴനയില/എടനഇല) in Malayalam, kadu dhalchini (:kn:ಕಾಡು ದಾಲ್ಚಿನ್ನಿ) in Kannada, and tamalpatra (તમલપત્ર) in Gujarati, or तमालपत्र in Marathi and in original Sanskrit, are used extensively in the cuisines of India, Nepal, and Bhutan, particularly in the Moghul cuisine of North India and Nepal and in tsheringma herbal tea in Bhutan. It is called biryani aaku or bagharakku in Telugu.

The Lepcha of Sikkim call it .

It is often used in kumbilappam or chakka-ada (ചക്ക അട), an authentic sweet from Kerala, infusing its characteristic flavor to the dumplings. They are often labeled as "Indian bay leaves," or just "bay leaf", causing confusion with the leaf from the bay laurel, a tree of Mediterranean origin in a different genus; the appearance and aroma of the two are quite different. Bay laurel leaves are shorter and light- to medium-green in color, with one large vein down the length of the leaf, while tejpat leaves are about twice as long and wider, usually olive green in color, with three veins down the length of the leaf. There are five types of tejpat leaves and they impart a strong cassia- or cinnamon-like aroma to dishes, while the bay laurel leaf's aroma is more reminiscent of pine and lemon.

Aroma attributes 

 Beta-caryophyllene
 Linalool
 Caryophyllene oxide
 Eugenol

Uses
The bark is sometimes used for cooking, although it is regarded as inferior to true cinnamon or cassia.

Etymology
Malabar had been traditionally used to denote the west coast of Southern India that forms the present-day state of Kerala and adjoining areas. The word mala or malaya means "mountain" in the Tamil and Malayalam languages, as also in Sanskrit. The word "malabathrum" is thought to have been derived from the Sanskrit tamālapattram (तमालपत्त्रम्), literally meaning "dark-tree leaves".

Related species
Cassia
Cinnamon
Saigon cinnamon

References

External links
 Indian bay-leaf page from Gernot Katzer's Spice Pages

tamala
Medicinal plants of Asia
Leaves
Indian cuisine
Nepalese cuisine
Bhutanese cuisine
Trees of China
Flora of the Indian subcontinent
Indian spices